Geofísica Internacional is a quarterly peer-reviewed open-access scientific journal published by the Instituto de Geofísica of the National Autonomous University of Mexico. It covers all aspects of geophysics and tectonics pertaining to Latin America. It was established in 1961 and the editor-in-chief is Servando de la Cruz Reyna (National Autonomous University of Mexico).

Abstracting and indexing
The journal is abstracted and indexed in Chemical Abstracts Service, GEOBASE, Science Citation Index Expanded, and Scopus. According to the Journal Citation Reports, the journal has a 2018 impact factor of 0.826.

References

External links
 

Geology journals
Geophysics journals
Multilingual journals
Quarterly journals
National Autonomous University of Mexico
Creative Commons Attribution-licensed journals
Publications established in 1961